The 1999 Categoria Primera A season, known as the 1999 Copa Mustang for sponsorship reasons, was the 52nd season of Colombia's top-tier football league. The season began on 7 February and ended on 19 December 1999.

Atlético Nacional were the champions, defeating América de Cali on penalties. Union Magdalena were relegated

Format 
This season was played in a format different from the standard one. The Apertura was played as follows: it consists of 6 rounds in Cuadrangulares, 15 rounds in a single round robin, and one round (22) with regional derbies. The winners qualify for the Copa Libertadores, runners-up for Copa Conmebol. 

The Finalizacion was played as: again 6 rounds of Cuadrangulares, 15 rounds in a single round robin, one more round of regional derbies, and then another set of Cuadrangulares according to the top eight teams of the table. The winners of each tournament qualify for the Copa Libertadores.  However, since America de Cali finished first in the Apertura and then won the championship, the spot was passed down to the second-placed team of the Aggregate table, Junior.

Apertura 
The Apertura was played as follows: it consists of six rounds in Cuadrangulares, 15 rounds in a single round robin, and one round (22) with regional derbies. The teams that get the first place will qualify directly to the Finals at the end of the year.

Standings 

 Pts=Points; GP=Games Played; W=Wins; D=Draws; L=Losses; GF=Goals Favored; GA=Goals Allowed; GD=Goal Difference

Fixtures

Finalizacion 
The Finalizacion was played as follows: again 6 rounds of Cuadrangulares, 15 rounds in a single round robin, one more round of regional derbies, and then another set of Cuadrangulares with the top eight teams of the table; the winners of groups A and B play two matches to decide who would qualify for the Championship finals against the first-placed team of the Apertura.

Standings 

 Pts=Points; GP=Games played; W=Wins; D=Draws; L=Losses; GF=Goals Favored; GA=Goals Allowed; GD=Goal Difference

Fixtures

Annual Standings 

 Pts=Points; GP=Games played; W=Wins; D=Draws; L=Losses; GF=Goals Favored; GA=Goals Allowed; GD=Difference

Relegated and Promoted Team(s)

Championship final qualifications 
This group stage decided the team that qualified to the Championship final against the team who won the Apertura tournament. It was played by eight teams in two different groups. The first teams from each group go to a final to decide the team who advanced to the Championship final.

Group A

Group B

Finalizacion Finals

1999 Copa Mustang Final

External links 
 Copa Mustang Official Page
 Dimayor Official Page

Categoría Primera A seasons
1
Col